The 2018 United States Senate election in Virginia took place on November 6, 2018, to elect a member of the United States Senate to represent the Commonwealth of Virginia, concurrently with other elections to the U.S. Senate, elections to the United States House of Representatives, and various state and local elections. Incumbent Democratic Senator Tim Kaine, who had been his party's nominee for Vice President two years earlier, was re-elected to a second term in office, winning this seat by the largest margin since 1988. The Republican Party of Virginia central committee voted to select the Republican nominee for Senate by a primary rather than a convention. Corey Stewart, chair of the Prince William Board of County Supervisors, won the Republican nomination on June 12, 2018, after defeating Delegate Nick Freitas and Christian minister E. W. Jackson.

Democratic primary

Candidates

Declared
 Tim Kaine, incumbent U.S. Senator, former governor, and Democratic nominee for vice president in 2016

Republican primary

Candidates

Declared
 Nick Freitas, state delegate
 E. W. Jackson, pastor, attorney, veteran, candidate for the U.S Senate in 2012 and nominee for lieutenant governor in 2013
 Corey Stewart, chairman of the Prince William Board of County Supervisors, candidate for lieutenant governor in 2013 and candidate for governor in 2017

Failed to qualify
 Minerva Diaz, veteran, businesswoman, and Christian minister
 Bert Mizusawa, former Deputy Undersecretary of the Army, retired U.S. Army Major General and candidate for VA-02 in 2010
 Ivan Raiklin, veteran and businessman

Declined
 Dave Brat, U.S. Representative
 Eric Cantor, former Majority Leader of the United States House of Representatives
 Barbara Comstock, U.S. Representative
 Ken Cuccinelli, former attorney general and nominee for governor in 2013
 Tom Davis, former U.S. Representative
 Jim Gilmore, former governor, nominee for the U.S. Senate in 2008 and candidate for president in 2008 and 2016
 Jimmie Massie, former state delegate
 Pete Snyder, technology entrepreneur and candidate for lieutenant governor in 2013
 Scott Taylor, U.S. Representative
 Rob Wittman, U.S. Representative
 Carly Fiorina, former CEO of Hewlett-Packard, nominee for the U.S. Senate from California in 2010 and candidate for president in 2016
 Ed Gillespie, former chairman of the Republican National Committee, nominee for the U.S. Senate in 2014, and nominee for governor in 2017
 Shak Hill, candidate for the U.S. Senate in 2014 (running for VA-10)
 Laura Ingraham, talk radio host, author, and conservative political commentator (endorsed Corey Stewart)
 Bob McDonnell, former governor of Virginia (endorsed Nick Freitas)
 John Moore, University of Virginia law professor and former diplomat
 Frank Wagner, state senator and candidate for governor in 2017

Endorsements

Polling

Results

Third party candidates
Matt Waters, director of development at Students For Liberty, received the Libertarian Party nomination on March 10, 2018. On June 28, 2018, he also received the endorsement of the Constitution Party of Virginia.
Winsome Sears, a Republican former state delegate, ran as a write-in candidate.

General election
The election featured a match-up of two Minnesota-born Virginians: Republican Corey Stewart was born in Duluth, Minnesota, and Democrat Tim Kaine was born in Saint Paul, Minnesota. All polls leading up to the election showed Kaine defeating Stewart by a wide margin.

Predictions

Debates/Townhalls

Endorsements

Polling

with Nick Freitas

with E. W. Jackson

with Dave Brat

with Barbara Comstock

with Carly Fiorina

with Laura Ingraham

with Scott Taylor

Results 
Kaine won the election by a wide margin.

See also
United States House of Representatives election in Virginia, 2018

References

External links
Candidates at Vote Smart
Candidates at Ballotpedia
Campaign finance at FEC
Campaign finance at OpenSecrets

Official campaign websites
Tim Kaine (D) for Senate
Corey Stewart (R) for Senate
Matt Waters (L) for Senate

2018
Virginia
Senate
Tim Kaine